Luffa is a genus of tropical and subtropical vines in the pumpkin, squash and gourd family (Cucurbitaceae).

In everyday non-technical usage, the luffa, also spelled loofah, usually refers to the fruits of the species Luffa aegyptiaca and Luffa acutangula. It is cultivated and eaten as a vegetable, but must be harvested at a young stage of development to be edible. The vegetable is popular in India, China, Bangladesh and Vietnam. When the fruit is fully ripened, it is very fibrous. The fully developed fruit is the source of the loofah scrubbing sponge which is used in bathrooms and kitchens.

Names
The name luffa was taken by European botanists in the 17th century from the Egyptian-Arabic name  lūf.

In North America it is sometimes known as "Chinese okra", and in Spanish as estropajo.

Uses

Fibers

The fruit section of L. aegyptiaca may be allowed to mature and used as a bath or kitchen sponge after being processed to remove everything except the network of xylem fibers. If the loofah is allowed to fully ripen and then dried on the vine, the flesh disappears, leaving only the fibrous skeleton and seeds, which can be easily shaken out. Marketed as luffa or loofah, the sponge is used as a body scrub in the shower.

In Paraguay, panels are made out of luffa combined with other vegetable matter and recycled plastic. These can be used to create furniture and construct houses.

Food

Indian subcontinent

In Hindi-speaking North Indian states, it is called torai, and cooked as vegetable. In eastern-UP it is also called nenua. But in central/Western India, specially in Madhya Pradesh, it is called gilki. Torai is reserved for ridge gourd and is less popular than gilki in central western India.

In Bhojpuri speaking regions it is called ghiura. Apart from fruit of the vegetable, flowers are also used as vegetable as chokha, tarua, pakoda, etc.

In Nepal and Nepali language speaking Indian states, it is called ghiraula (घिरौंला). It is popular vegetable usually cooked with tomato and potatoes and served with rice.

It is a simple but very popular vegetable usually made with a plentiful tomato gravy and garnished with green chillies and fresh coriander. When cooked roti is shredded by hand and mixed into it, it is colloquially known as "rotli shaak ma bhuseli". Alternatively this dish is also eaten mixed with plain cooked rice.

In Bengali-speaking Bangladesh and the Indian state of West Bengal, it is known as dhudhul and a popular vegetable. It is eaten fried or cooked with shrimp, fish, or meat.

In Assam, it is called bhul (ভুল) and is cooked with sour fish curry along with taro.

In Tamil Nadu, Luffa acutangula (ridged gourd) is called peerkangai (பீர்க்கங்காய்) and Luffa aegyptiaca / Luffa cylindrica (sponge gourd) is called nurai peerkankai (நுரை  பீர்க்கங்காய்) and are used as vegetables to make peerkangai kootu, poriyal, and thogayal. Even the skin is used to make chutney.

In Karnataka's Malenadu (Western Ghats) it is known as tuppadahirekayi, which literally translates as "buttersquash", also known as Hirekayi in Kannada. It grows naturally in this region and is consumed when it is still tender and green. It is used as a vegetable in curries, but also as a snack, bhajji, dipped in chickpea batter and deep fried. In Tulu language it is known as Peere and is used to prepare chutney and ajethna.

In Telangana, it is called beerakaya. It is used in making Dal, Fry, Roti Pacchadi, and wet curry.

In Andhra Pradesh, it is called nethi beerakaya or beerakaya. And in Assam it is called jika (জিকা, Luffa acutangula) and bhula (ভোল, Luffa aegyptiaca). It is used as a vegetable in a curry, chutney and stir fry.

In Kerala, it is called peechinga; in the Palakkad area it is particularly called poththanga and used in while bathing. It is also used as a vegetable, cooked with dal or stir fried. Fully matured fruit is used as a natural scrub in rural Kerala. In some places such as Wayanad, it grows as a creeper on fences.

In Maharashtra, India,  (ridge gourd luffa) and ghosavala (smooth luffa) are common vegetables prepared with either crushed dried peanuts or with beans.

In Manipur, India,  is cooked with other ingredients like potato, dried fish, fermented fish and served. It is also steamed and consumed or crushed with other ingredients and served with steamed rice (chaak). Fried ones are also favorites for many. Sebot is also eaten as a green vegetable

Other Asian cuisines
In Vietnamese cuisine, the gourd is called "" and is a common ingredient in soups and stir-fried dishes.

In China and Taiwan (where it is called , or in English, "silk melon"), Indonesia (where it is called oyong), and the Philippines (where it is called patola in Tagalog and kabatiti in Ilokano), in Timor-Leste it is also called "patola" or "batola" in Tetum and in Manipur, India, (where it is called ) the luffa is eaten as a green vegetable in various dishes.

In Japan it is called hechima and is cultivated all over the country during summer. It is commonly used as a green vegetable in traditional dishes of the Ryukyu Islands (where it is called naabeeraa). In other regions it is also grown for uses other than food.
 
In Nepal it is called ghiraula and consumed as a vegetable at a young age. When it becomes ripe and dried, it is used as a body scrubbing material during bathing.

Western cuisines
Luffa is also known as "Chinese okra" in Canada and the U.S.

Other uses
In Japan, in regions other than the Ryukyu Islands and Kyushu, it is predominantly grown for use as a sponge or for applying soap, shampoo, and lotion. As with bitter melon, many people grow it outside building windows as a natural sunscreen in summer.

Role in food chain
Luffa species are used as food plants by the larvae of some Lepidoptera species, including Hypercompe albicornis.

Mechanical properties
The luffa sponge is a biological cellular material. These materials often exhibit exceptional mechanical properties at low densities. While their mechanical performance tends to fall behind manmade materials, such as alloys, ceramics, plastics, and composites, as a structural material, they have long term sustainability for the natural environment. When compressed longitudinally, a luffa sponge is able to absorb comparable energy per unit mass as aluminum foam. Luffa sponges are composed of a complex network of fiber bundles connected to form a 3-dimensional, highly-porous network.

The hierarchical structure of luffa sponges results in mechanical properties that vary with the component of sponge tested. Specifically, the mechanical properties of fiber bundles differ from those of blocks from the bulk of the sponge, which differ from those of the cross sections of the entire sponge.

Fiber-bundles
Uniaxial tensile tests of fiber bundles isolated from the inner surface provide insight this basic strut element of the luffa sponges. These fibers bundles vary in diameter from 0.3 to 0.5 mm. Each fiber bundle has a low density core region not occupied by fibers. The stress-strain response of the fiber bundles is nearly linear elastic all the way until fracture, suggesting the absence of work hardening. The slope of the linear region of the stress-strain curve, or Young’s modulus, is 236* MPa. The highest stress achieved before fracture, or ultimate tensile strength, is 103 MPa. The strain at which failure occurs, or failure strain, is small at only 5%. The mechanical properties of fiber bundles decrease dramatically when the size of the hollow region inside the bundle increases.  Despite their low tensile strength, the fiber bundles have a high specific modulus of 2.07– 4.05 MPa⋅m3/kg, and their overall properties are improved when a high ratio of their cross sectional area is occupied by fibers, the fibers are evenly distributed, and there is strong adhesion between fibers.

Bulk-sponge

Block samples (height: 12.69 ± 2.35mm, width: 11.30 ± 2.88mm, length: 13.10 ± 2.64mm) cut from the core region and hoop region of the luffa sponge exhibit different mechanical behaviors under compression depending on both the orientation they are loaded in as well as the location in the sponge they are sampled from. The hoop region consists of the section of sponge located around the outside between the inner and outer surfaces, while the core region is from the sponge center. Samples from both the hoop and core regions exhibited yielding when compressed in the longitudinal direction due to the buckling of fibers. With the highly aligned fibers from the inner surface removed from the hoop region block samples, this yield behavior disappears. In general, the inner surface fibers most significant impact the longitudinal properties of the luffa sponge column followed by the circumferential properties. There is no noticeable contribution to the radial properties. Additionally, the core region exhibits lower yield stress and energy absorption (as determined by the area under the stress-strain curve) compared to the hoop region due to its greater porosity.

Overall, the stress-strain curves of block samples exhibit three stages of mechanical behavior common to porous materials. Namely, the samples follow linear elasticity for strains less than 10%, followed by a plateau for strains from 10% to 60%, and finally a stress increase associated with densification at strains greater than 60%. Segment samples created from cross sections of the entire luffa sponge (diameter: 92.51 ± 6.15mm, height: 19.76 ± 4.95mm) when tested in compression exhibit this same characteristic behavior. The three stages can be described by the equations:

 Linear elasticity region:  for 
 Plateau region:  for 
 Densification region:  for  

These are chosen to best fit experimental data.

Here  is the density of the bulk sponge  is the density of its constituent, the fiber bundle. The constant D defines the strain at the onset of densification as well as the stress relationship in the densification region. It is determined by fitting experimental data.

Dynamic loading
The mechanical properties of Luffa sponges change under different strain rates. Specifically, energy adsorption, compressive stress, and plateau stress (which is in the case of foam materials corresponds to the yield stress) are enhanced by increasing the strain rate. One explanation for this is that the luffa fibers undergo more axial deformation when dynamically loaded (high strain rates) than when quasi-statically loaded (low strain rates).

Gallery

References

External links

 Multilingual taxonomic information from the University of Melbourne

Cucurbitaceae genera
Cucurbitoideae
Fruit vegetables
Taxa named by Philip Miller